Effingham Junction Carriage Holding Sidings is  located in Effingham, Surrey, on the New Guildford Line and is near Effingham Junction station.

History 
In 1983, Class 416, Class 423 and Class 508 EMUs could be seen.

Present 
It is a stabling point for Class 73 locomotives.

References 

Railway sidings in England